Sir Patrick Duncan,  (21 December 1870 – 17 July 1943) was the sixth Governor-General of the Union of South Africa, holding office from 1937 until his death in 1943.

Early life

Born in Scotland in 1870, he took degrees in classics at the University of Edinburgh and at Balliol College, Oxford, and studied law in the Inner Temple, before joining the British civil service in 1894 as a Clerk of the Upper Division in the Secretaries' Office for Inland Revenue.

Colonial service

In 1901, during the Anglo-Boer War (1899–1902), he was recruited by Viscount Milner, to join a team of young administrators - known as "Milner's Kindergarten" - to govern and anglicise the British-occupied Transvaal.  He was Colonial Secretary of the Transvaal from 1903 until the colony was granted self-government in 1907, playing an important part in the repatriation of ex-prisoners of war, and in the social and financial reconstruction of the former Boer state.

Duncan practised as an attorney from 1907 to 1910, and was a legal adviser to the Transvaal delegation to the 1908-1909 National Convention that drew up the South Africa Act that established the Union of South Africa.

Political career

He was a member of the Union Parliament from 1910 to 1936, first as a member of the Unionist Party, then of the South African Party and its successor the United Party.  He was Minister of Education, the Interior, and Public Health in the SAP administration from 1921 to 1924, and Minister of Mines in the UP administration from 1933 to 1936.

Governor-General of South Africa

Duncan was appointed Governor-General in 1937, the first South African citizen appointee to hold the post. King George VI, whom he represented as head of state, knighted him and appointed him to the Imperial Privy Council of the United Kingdom.

Although widely respected and above party politics, he made himself controversial in 1939 by refusing to call a general election on the question of whether or not the Union should enter World War II.
The prime minister, J.B.M. Hertzog, a former Boer General, wanted to stay neutral, but Parliament, included most members of his own party, supported his deputy, Jan Smuts. Like Hertzog, Smuts also famously commanded Boer forces during the war but nonetheless favored entering the war on the side of the Allies. Sir Patrick's refusal to call a new election rendered Hertzog a lame duck, after losing a vote of no-confidence he resigned from office. Sir Patrick swiftly commissioned Smuts to form a new government. 

With Smuts as Prime Minister, South Africa entered the war as a loyal ally of Great Britain, South Africa's entry into World War II triggered both short and long term political re-alignments that eventually led to Smuts being forced out of politics after the war and South Africa withdrawing from the British Commonwealth on 31 May 1961. However, Sir Patrick would never witness these events transpire, dying in office in 1943. His ashes were interred in a monument at the new Duncan Dock in Cape Town harbour, which was named after him.  The informal township of Duncan Village in East London, and the suburb of Duncanville near Vereeniging, were also named after him.

Family

Sir Patrick married Alice Dold in 1916.  They had three sons and a daughter.  One son, Andrew (1920–1942), was killed on active service in Libya.  Another son, Patrick (1918–1967), was a well-known anti-apartheid activist.

Honours

References

Sources
 Dictionary of South African Biography Volume I
 Standard Encyclopedia of Southern Africa Volume 4

External links

 

1870 births
1943 deaths
Governors-General of South Africa
South African Knights Grand Cross of the Order of St Michael and St George
South African members of the Privy Council of the United Kingdom
South African knights
Unionist Party (South Africa) politicians
South African Party (Union of South Africa) politicians
Members of the House of Assembly (South Africa)
Ministers of Home Affairs of South Africa
Education ministers of South Africa
Health ministers of South Africa
Alumni of the University of Edinburgh
Scottish emigrants to South Africa
Knights of the Order of St John
South African Queen's Counsel
World War II political leaders